Karl Glitscher (1886 – 1945) was a German physicist who made contributions to quantum mechanics.

Education
Glitscher studied under Arnold Sommerfeld at the Ludwig Maximilian University of Munich. For his doctoral dissertation, Sommerfeld asked Glitscher to compare the relativistic theory of the electron with  Max Abraham's theory of the rigid electron relative to the fine structure of spectral lines.  Following a suggestion by Wilhelm Lenz, a former student of Sommerfeld who received his doctorate in 1911, Glitscher was able to calculate the fine structure spectra and he found that the rigid electron was ruled out by  Friedrich Paschen's data on one-electron atoms and the X-ray spectral doublets.  Glitscher's theoretical calculations served as his doctoral thesis, and he was awarded his doctorate in 1917.

Career
Glitscher filed a patent in Germany in 1930 and in the United States in 1931 for an artificial horizon indicator for vehicles or similar platforms.  The patent was assigned to Gesellschaft für elektrische Apparate mbH, in Marienfelde-Berlin. The Gesellschaft für elektrische Apparate (Gelap) was founded in 1920 to refine technical military equipment.  Gelap evolved from the signals department of Siemens & Halske and produced communication and command systems for military organizations and commercial shipping.

Selected Literature
 Karl Glitscher Spektroskopischer Vergleich zwischen den Theorien des starren und des deformierbaren Elektrons, Annalen der Physik 52 608–630 (1917) (abridged doctoral dissertation, University of Munich; received 14 May 1917, published in issue No.6 of 17 July 1917) as cited in Mehra, Volume 1, Part 2, 2001, p. 778.

Patents
K. Glitscher US Patent 1,932,210, Indicator Berlin-Dauern, Germany, assigned to Gesellschaft für elektrische Apparate mbH, Marienfelde-Berlin, Germany.  U.S. Application filed 19 September 1931, Serial Number 563,799, and in Germany 12 August 1930. (Google Patents, via scholar.google.com.)

References
Jammer, Max The Conceptual Development of Quantum Mechanics (McGraw-Hill, 1966)
Mehra, Jagdish, and Helmut Rechenberg The Historical Development of Quantum Theory. Volume 1 Part 1 The Quantum Theory of Planck, Einstein, Bohr and Sommerfeld 1900–1925: Its Foundation and the Rise of Its Difficulties. (Springer, 2001) 
Mehra, Jagdish, and Helmut Rechenberg The Historical Development of Quantum Theory. Volume 1 Part 2 The Quantum Theory of Planck, Einstein, Bohr and Sommerfeld 1900–1925: Its Foundation and the Rise of Its Difficulties. (Springer, 2001)

Notes

1886 births
20th-century German physicists
1945 deaths
Ludwig Maximilian University of Munich alumni